Palmetto Ridge High School is a secondary education school located near Naples, in an unincorporated census-designated place in Collier County, Florida, United States. Palmetto Ridge High School is part of the District School Board of Collier County.

Athletics 
Palmetto Ridge High School is one of the seven members of the Collier County Athletic Conference. It lists its athletics departments as follows:

Fall sports
Boys' & girls' cross country
American football
Boys' & girls' golf
Boys' & girls' swimming & diving
Girls' volleyball
Girls' cheerleading

Winter sports
Boys' & girls' soccer
wrestling
Boys' & girls' basketball

Spring sports
Boys' baseball
Girls' softball
Boys' & girls' tennis
Boys' & girls' track and field
Girls' cheerleading
Boys' & girls' lacrosse

Bands
Marching Band
Wind Ensemble
Symphonic Winds
Wind Symphony 
Symphonic Band
Jazz Band- 1 and 2 
 Guard- Weapon Line and Flag Line

The school's show band has received straight superiors at the Florida Bandmaster's Association Musical Performance Assessment from its opening in 2004 to the present (as of 2018), and is the first to institute a competition band for Collier County Schools. Palmetto Ridge's competition band was placed third at the FMBC State Finals in its introductory year of 2009.

Career academies
Palmetto Ridge High School has two different career academies. The goal of these programs is to help students who are interested in a certain career. Over the course of their high school education, students enrolled in the academy take several classes relating to the academy, some of which are classes specifically made for academy students.
 Academy of Construction and Fine Woodworking
 Culinary Arts Academy

Clubs
Palmetto Ridge High School has many different extracurricular clubs, including:

Army Junior Reserve Officers' Training Corps
Fellowship of Christian Athletes
International Thespian Society
Key Club
Marching Band
Meme Club
Model United Nations
Mu Alpha Theta
National Honor Society
Project Unify
Scholar Bowl
Science National Honor Society
Spanish Honor Society 
Student Government Association
Yearbook

Demographics 
The District School Board of Collier County web site updates each school's demographics daily. On September 3, 2019, the school's enrollment was:
Male: 1108
Female: 973
Total: 2081

References

External links
Palmetto Ridge High School
School profile

High schools in Collier County, Florida
Public high schools in Florida
Buildings and structures in Naples, Florida
2005 establishments in Florida
Educational institutions established in 2005